Northridge High School is located in Greeley, Colorado, United States. It is a part of Weld County School District 6. Northridge was established in 2000.

References

External links

Educational institutions established in 2000
Public high schools in Colorado
Schools in Weld County, Colorado
2000 establishments in Colorado